John Edward (born 22 September 1968) is Head of Operations of the Scottish Council on Global Affairs Scotland's first international relations institute, previously a charity CEO, an EU and Scottish civil servant and campaigner.

Education
John Edward was educated at the University of St Andrews (Scottish History), the University of Glasgow and the Università per Stranieri di Siena.

Career
After working as a stagiaire (intern) in ECHO (European Commission) in Brussels, John Edward worked for the European Policy Centre as personal assistant to Max Kohnstamm.  
He was employed for 5 years as the EU Policy Manager by Scotland Europa. 

John Edward was then Parliamentary Manager for Scottish Enterprise then served as Head of the Office in Scotland of the European Parliament from 2003 to 2009.

From 2010 to 2023, John Edward was Director of the Scottish Council of Independent Schools.

European campaigning
John Edward was Chief Campaign Spokesman for Scotland Stronger in Europe, the discrete Scottish campaign to Remain in the European Union during the 2016 United Kingdom European Union membership referendum.

From 2016 to 2018, John Edward represented Scotland for Open Britain.   In 2018-19 he chaired media events for the Scotland  element of the People's Vote campaign.

He contributed a chapter on "Soft power in hard times" to the 2017 IPPR publication, "Scotland, the UK and Brexit: A guide to the future".

He was a Liberal Democrat candidate in the 2019 European Parliament election in the United Kingdom, for the Scotland region.

Other activities
John Edward served on the Presiding Officer of the Scottish Parliament's Commission on Parliamentary Reform which produced a Report on how the Scottish Parliament can engage better with the people of Scotland and how its work can be improved to deliver better scrutiny in 2017.

He was a member of the Steel Commission on “Moving Towards Federalism” from 2003 to 2006, and a member of the Campbell Commission on “Home and Community Rule” from 2011 to 2012.

John Edward is a trustee of the Scottish European Educational Trust, a non-political charity which promotes unbiased education about Europe and the wider world and encourages language learning amongst young people throughout Scotland.

References 

1968 births
Living people
Civil servants from Edinburgh
Alumni of the University of St Andrews
Alumni of the University of Glasgow
Brexit
Devolution in the United Kingdom